Eve is the seventh studio album by American post-hardcore band Emery. The album was released on November 9, 2018, through the band's own label, BadChristian Music.

Background
Emery launched an Indiegogo campaign on March 17, 2017, for the band's seventh studio album. The campaign had a finance goal of $50,000 and was met after just 36 hours. Backers were given an instant download of the Emery: Classics Reimagined EP, which features re-recorded versions of "So Cold I Can See My Breath", "As Your Voice Fades", and "The Smile, The Face".

Controversy
The cover art, which features a naked woman with a bag over her head, caused some controversy due to the woman's buttocks being exposed. An edited version of the artwork was created by Jesus Freak Hideout.

The title for the song "2007 Clarksville High Volleyball State Champs Gay Is OK" also caused some controversy in the Christian music scene, with Trenton Worsham of Sound Link Magazine saying "when it comes to controversies or things to get people talking, it seems when a band aligned with a religious background and does something seemingly normal, the world loses their minds."

Track listing

Personnel

Emery
Toby Morrell – lead vocals, bass, screamed vocals
Matt Carter – guitar, backing vocals, producer
Josh Head – keyboards, programming, screamed vocals
Devin Shelton – vocals
Dave Powell – drums, percussion

Additional
Beau Burchell – producer, mixing
Chris Keene – producer
Troy Glessner – mastering
John Maciel – editing, mixing assistant
Christopher McKenney – photography
Devin Shelton – art direction
Alexander C. Sprungle – design, layout

Charts

References

2018 albums
Emery (band) albums
Crowdfunded albums